Christian "Tian" Viljoen (born 10 April 1961) is a former professional tennis player from South Africa. He enjoyed most of his tennis success while playing doubles. During his career, he finished runner-up in doubles at three events. He achieved a career-high doubles ranking of world No. 49 in January 1983.

Career finals

Doubles (3 runner-ups)

External links
 
 

Afrikaner people
South African people of Dutch descent
South African male tennis players
Living people
1961 births